Gopa or Gop or Gope is a synonym of the Yadav (Ahir) caste. It is generally used as a title by the Ahir caste in the states of Bihar, Jharkhand and West Bengal of East India and even in Terai region of Nepal.

Etymology
The sanskrit word Gopa, originally meant only a cowherd; it then came to mean the head of cowpen and lastly the chief of a tribe.

Origin and history

Kingdom

 Gopala Dynasty and Mahisapala dynasty of Nepal, it was established by the Gopa or Abhira.
 Sadgop Dynasty of Gopbhum. It had two Sadgop (Gopa) kings, one ruled from Amrargar and other from Dhekur (also known as Trisasthigar).
 Sadgop rulers of Midnapore Raj and Narajole Raj.
 Sadgop Kings of Narayangarh and Balrampur.
 Gopa (Ahir) chieftain and zamindari of Murho Estate, Parasadi Estate, Belwarganj Estate, Ranipatti Estate, Tintanga Estate, Surul Raj, Hadal-Narayanpur Estate, Kalikapura Raj etc in Bihar and West Bengal.

Gop Jatiye Mahasabha
Gop Jatiye Mahasabha was formed by Babu Ras Bihari Lal Mandal in 1911, It was the regional organization of Gope or Ahir caste of Bihar, Bengal & Orissa.

Later, the All-India Yadav Mahasabha was formed by merging the Gop Jatiye Mahasabha and Ahir/Yadav Kshatriya Mahasabha. AIYM first National Conference was held in Purnea, Bihar on 17 to 20 April 1924.

Present circumstances
Gopa or Ahir are mainly a landholding community and they are rich cultivators in Indian state of Bihar, Jharkhand and West Bengal.

See also
 Yadav
 Ahir
 Bihari Ahir
 Sadgop

References

Hindu mythology
Yadav
Hindu communities
Social groups of Bihar
Social groups of Haryana
Social groups of West Bengal
Social groups of Maharashtra
Social groups of Chhattisgarh
Social groups of Uttar Pradesh